Westridge may refer to:

Geography

Canada
Westridge, British Columbia, a residential neighbourhood in Burnaby, British Columbia
Westridge (Edmonton), a residential neighbourhood in Edmonton, Alberta
Westridge Shopping Centre

Pakistan
Westridge, Rawalpindi, a residential area in Cantonment board, Rawalpindi

South Africa
Westridge, Mitchells Plain, a residential neighbourhood in Cape Town, Western Cape.

United Kingdom
Westridge, Isle of Wight, a suburb and industrial area of Ryde on the Isle of Wight.
Aldworth neighbouring hamlet Westridge Green.

United States
Westridge, Arizona
Westridge, California
Westridge Park, Arizona

Schools
 Westridge Elementary School
 Westridge School (Pasadena), a girls' school
 Westridge High School in Zimbabwe

Sport
 Westridge FC, a football team in Singapore